Woman of the Year (1942) is an American romantic comedy-drama film starring Spencer Tracy and Katharine Hepburn.

Woman of the Year may also refer to:

Arts and entertainment
Little Mother (1973 film), released in some regions under the title Woman of the Year
Woman of the Year (1976 film), a 1976 comedy TV movie directed by Jud Taylor
Woman of the Year (musical), musical adaptation of the film
Woman of the Year (Parks and Recreation), an episode of the television show
"Woman of the Year" (song), by Calvin Harris from the 2022 album Funk Wav Bounces Vol. 2

Awards
Billboard Woman of the Year by Billboard magazine
Woman of the Year Awards awarded by Glamour magazine

See also
Women of the Year Lunch
Person of the Year
Year of the Woman
Man of the Year (disambiguation)